Moderate Tropical Storm Ana was a deadly tropical cyclone that affected the African nations of Madagascar, Malawi and Mozambique and the third-deadliest tropical cyclone in 2022 thus far, after the Western Pacific Tropical Storm Megi and Hurricane Ian (with the latter impacting Madagascar two weeks after Ana). The first named storm of the 2021–22 South-West Indian Ocean cyclone season, Ana developed from an area of convection that was designated as Invest 93S northeast of Madagascar.

Meteorological history

At midday, the MFR observed a closed circulation north-northwest of Saint-Brandon, with a rather ill-defined center. The formation of the disturbance was caused by the surge of monsoonal flow. By the evening, the JTWC upgraded the system to a medium chance for potential tropical cyclogenesis, after noticing its obscure low-level circulation (LLC). Early the next day, at 02:00 UTC, the JTWC issued its Tropical Cyclone Formation Alert (TCFA) for Invest 93S and also upgraded the system again to a high chance for potential tropical cyclogenesis, as the agency noted its consolidation into a well-defined low-level center. Later at 12:00 UTC, the MFR declared the tropical low pressure system as a zone of disturbed weather, becoming the first system of the season. The department noted the elongated circulation, which was a little more compact than yesterday, but still rather poorly organized. Twelve hours later, the MFR upgraded it to tropical disturbance status, as they found that the system's cloud pattern had improved. Furthermore, its center had become well-defined but was still overall ill-defined and elongated. The disturbance slowly consolidated into a defined convective structure while also developing distinct curved rainbands, which prompted the MFR to upgrade it to a tropical depression by 06:00 UTC on 22 January.

Between 08:00 UTC and 09:00 UTC, the system's center crossed between Toamasina and Île Sainte-Marie as a tropical depression, with the MFR re-classifying the system as an overland depression. Because of the mountainous terrain of Madagascar, the system weakened a bit but still managed to preserve its organized convection and its low-level center. At 06:00 UTC the next day, the MFR re-classified it again as a tropical disturbance after entering the Mozambique Channel. Six hours later, it re-intensified into a tropical depression, as it gradually improved its convective structure and cooling of its convective bands. Its low-level clouds had developed a distinct curved pattern near the center. This occurred after entering the Mozambique Channel, where more conductive environmental conditions were available along with good convergence of monsoonal flow. At 15:00 UTC, the JTWC declared the system a tropical cyclone and designated it 07S. The MFR later upgraded it to a moderate tropical storm and named it Ana, becoming the first named storm of the season. It then made landfall in Mozambique, and rapidly weakened, primarily due to friction in land mass.

Impact
The storm caused dozens of casualties in Madagascar, Malawi and Mozambique, while causing severe damage to infrastructure in Malawi. It was feared that Cyclone Batsirai – which made landfall in Madagascar on 6 February – would hinder relief work.

Madagascar 
A series of floods killed 11 people on 18 January. New heavy rains and floods increased the death toll to 58 in Madagascar. 55,000 people lost their homes.

Malawi 
The region around Mulanje in Southern Malawi was particularly affected. In Malawi 37 were reported dead with another 22 remaining missing as of 31 January. 158 people were injured. Most of the country lost electricity, and 200,000 had to leave their homes. 109,359 people were forced to reside in emergency camps. Floods damaged the Kapichira Hydroelectric Power Station, which provides 30% of the country's electricity. The nationwide electricity supply remained intermittent days after the storm passed.

Mozambique 
The storm also killed 20 people in Mozambique. 10,000 houses in Mozambique were destroyed as a result of the storm.

See also
Weather of 2022
Tropical cyclones in 2022
Tropical Storm Dumako (2022) – another tropical storm which affected the same countries a month after Ana.

References

External links

 Météo-France La Réunion
 Direction Générale de la Météorologie de Madagascar
 Mauritius Meteorological Services
 Joint Typhoon Warning Center (JTWC)

2021–22 South-West Indian Ocean cyclone season
2022 disasters in Africa
2022 in Madagascar
2022 in Malawi
2022 in Mozambique
2020s in Mauritius
2020s in Zambia
Cyclones in Madagascar
Cyclones in Mozambique
January 2022 events in Africa
Tropical cyclones in 2022
Moderate tropical storms